BRCA1-A complex subunit BRE is a protein that in humans is encoded by the BRE gene.

Repair of DNA damage

BRE, the protein product of the BRE (gene), is a core component of the deubiquitin complex BRCA1-A.  Other core components of the BRCA1-A complex are the BRCC36 protein (BRCC3 gene), MERIT40 protein (BABAM1 gene), and RAP80 protein (UIMC1 gene).

BRCA1, as distinct from BRCA1-A,  is employed in the repair of chromosomal damage with an important role in the error-free homologous recombinational (HR) repair of DNA double-strand breaks.  Sequestration of BRCA1 away from the DNA damage site suppresses homologous recombination and redirects the cell in the direction of repair by the process of non-homologous end joining (NHEJ).  The role of BRCA1-A appears to be to bind BRCA1 with high affinity and withdraw it away from the site of DNA damage to the periphery where it remains sequestered, thus promoting NHEJ in preference to HR.

Protein-protein interactions 

BRE (gene) has been shown to interact with:

 BARD1,
 BRCA1, 
 BRCA2, 
 BRCC3, 
 C19orf62, 
 P53, and 
 RAD51.

References

External links

Further reading